Idée Fixe is an album by Czesław Niemen's band Aerolit released in 1978 on two long play and one extended play  discs. It was remastered in 2003 as a two CD album.

The two long play discs are highly conceptual and deal with Cyprian Kamil Norwid's poems, philosophy, and worldview. The extended play disc contains fragments of the score for Juliusz Słowacki's Sen srebrny Salomei.

Track listing
All music by Czesław Niemen.

Side 1
 "QSS (Sygnały)" - 3:07 (instrumental)
 "Larwa" - 7:20 (lyrics Cyprian Kamil Norwid)
 "Moja piosenka" - 6:44 (lyrics Cyprian Kamil Norwid)
 "W poszukiwaniu źródła" - 2:35 (instrumental)

Side 2
 "Chłodna ironia przemijających pejzaży" - 12:51 (lyrics Cyprian Kamil Norwid)
 "Straceńcy" - 1:24 (instrumental)
 "Laur dojrzały" - 5:19 (lyrics Cyprian Kamil Norwid)

Side 3
 "Idącej kupić talerz pani M." - 5:09 (lyrics Cyprian Kamil Norwid)
 "Białe góry" - 11:30 (instrumental)
 "Legenda scytyjska" - 3:23 (instrumental)

Side 4
 "QSS II" - 2:40 (instrumental)
 "Twarzą do Słońca" - 7:04 (instrumental)
 "Credo" - 8:16 (lyrics Cyprian Kamil Norwid)

EP
 Music for play "Sen srebrny Salomei" ("Salomea's dream of silver") - fragments
 Music for play "Sen srebrny Salomei" - Pieśń Wernyhory (lyrics Juliusz Słowacki)

Personnel
Czesław Niemen - vocal, synthesizers, electric piano, piano, melotron, clavinet
Sławomir Piwowar - guitars
Maciej Radziejewski - guitars
Jerzy Dziemski - bass, violin, percussion
Stanisław Kasprzyk - drums, percussion
Zbigniew Namysłowski - sax

2003 CD Reissue

Idée Fixe I 
 "Sieroctwo" - 8:48 (lyrics Cyprian Kamil Norwid)
 "QSS I (Pytanie o naszą skromność)" - 3:04 (instrumental)
 "Larwa (Wszechcywilizacji społeczny blues)" - 7:27 (lyrics Cyprian Kamil Norwid)
 "Moja piosenka" - 6:49 (lyrics Cyprian Kamil Norwid)
 "W poszukiwaniu źródła" - 2:38 (instrumental)
 "Chłodna ironia przemijających pejzaży" - 13:03 (lyrics Cyprian Kamil Norwid)
 "Straceńcy (Z wypraw nie tylko krzyżowych)" - 1:26 (instrumental)
 "Laur dojrzały" - 5:25 (lyrics Cyprian Kamil Norwid)

Idée Fixe II 

 "Larwa (2)" - 7:22 (lyrics Cyprian Kamil Norwid)
 "Idącej kupić talerz pani M." - 5:15 (lyrics Cyprian Kamil Norwid)
 "Białe góry" - 9:35 (instrumental)
 "Legenda scytyjska" - 3:27 (instrumental)
 "QSS II" - 2:45 (instrumental)
 "Twarzą do Słońca" - 7:09 (instrumental)
 "Credo" - 8:21 (lyrics Cyprian Kamil Norwid)
 "Proroctwo Wernyhory" - 0:32 (instrumental)
 "Spotkanie Leona i Salomei" - 0:46 (instrumental)
 "W obozie ukraińskim" - 1:31 (instrumental)
 "Zazdrość Semenki" - 0:34 (instrumental)
 "Przybycie regimentu" - 0:55 (instrumental)
 "Defilada" - 0:52 (instrumental)
 "Mazurek weselny" - 1:09 (instrumental)
 "Pieśń Wernyhory" - 5:43 (lyrics Juliusz Słowacki)
Tracks from 8 to 15 are from play "Sen srebrny Salomei".

References

External links
 Album information 

Czesław Niemen albums
1978 albums